Stathmopoda albimaculata is a species of moth in the Stathmopodidae family. It is endemic to New Zealand. It is classified as Nationally Endangered by the Department of Conservation.

Taxonomy 
S. albimaculata was described by Alfred Philpott in 1931. Philpott used a female moth collected by Charles E. Clarke at Woodside, Taieri in December. This holotype specimen is held at the Auckland War Memorial Museum. George Vernon Hudson also used this specimen to describe and figure the species in his 1939 publication A supplement to the butterflies and moths of New Zealand.

Distribution 
It is endemic to New Zealand. As well as being collected at Taieri, this species has also been found in central and western Otago, The Catlins, Southland, and the Waitaki Valley.

Habitat and ecology 
This species inhabits areas from 50m up to 900m in elevation. Along with habitat that includes the various Olearia species that host S. albimaculata, this moth has also been found to inhabit lowland podocarp/hardwood forest.   Adult moths are on the wing between the months of October and February. They are most common in January and February.

Host plants 
The species is associated with the nationally endangered plant Olearia hectorii, as well as Olearia odorata and Olearia virgata.

Conservation status 
S. albimaculata has been classified under the New Zealand Threat Classification system as being Nationally Endangered.

References

External links

Image of S. albimaculata plate LX fig. 6

Moths described in 1931
Stathmopodidae
Moths of New Zealand
Endemic fauna of New Zealand
Endangered biota of New Zealand
Endemic moths of New Zealand